Charnwood Borough Council elections are held every four years. Charnwood Borough Council is the local authority for the non-metropolitan district of Charnwood in Leicestershire, England. Since the last boundary changes in 2003, 52 councillors have been elected from 28 wards. New ward boundaries will come into effect for the 2023 election.

Political control
The first election to the council was held in 1973, initially operating as a shadow authority before coming into its powers on 1 April 1974. Since 1973 political control of the council has been held by the following parties:

Leadership
The leaders of the council since 2010 have been:

Council elections

1973 Charnwood Borough Council election
1976 Charnwood Borough Council election
1979 Charnwood Borough Council election
1983 Charnwood Borough Council election (New ward boundaries)
1987 Charnwood Borough Council election (Borough boundary changes took place but the number of seats remained the same)
1991 Charnwood Borough Council election
1995 Charnwood Borough Council election
1999 Charnwood Borough Council election
2003 Charnwood Borough Council election (New ward boundaries)
2007 Charnwood Borough Council election
2011 Charnwood Borough Council election
2015 Charnwood Borough Council election
2019 Charnwood Borough Council election

Election results

Source:

A dash indicates that the results for a particular election are not available, or that a party did not stand in an election.

By-election results

1995-1999

1999-2003

2003-2007

2007-2011

2011-2015

 

Death of Conservative Cllr Stuart Jones.

2015-2019

2019-2023

References

By-election results

External links
Charnwood Borough Council

 
Council elections in Leicestershire
District council elections in England